The South Wales Alliance League is a football league structure in South Wales, currently known for sponsorship reasons as The Highadmit Projects South Wales Alliance League. The top tier of the league, the Premier Division is at the fourth tier of the Welsh Football Pyramid and offers promotion opportunities to the tier 3 Football Association of Wales administered Ardal Leagues.  The league is run by the South Wales Football Association.

The league was formed in 2015 by a merger of the South Wales Senior League and the South Wales Amateur League.

In April 2022, the league, after discussions with the South Wales Football Association, announced planned changes to the league structure from the 2023–24 season. The current set up of three divisions of sixteen clubs will move to four divisions of twelve with a Premier Division, Division One and two regionalised Division Twos. As a result of this at the end of the 2022–23 season, teams finishing in 11th to 16th places in the Premier Division will be relegated to Division One.

Member clubs for 2022–23 season
The following clubs will compete.

Premier Division

 Aber Valley
 AFC Porth
 Blaenrhondda (club folded July 2022)
 Bridgend Street
 Canton Liberal
 Cardiff Airport 
 Cardiff Corinthians
 Ely Rangers 
 FC Cwmaman
 Garw SBGC
 Llanrumney United
 Merthyr Saints
 Pencoed Athletic
 Porthcawl Town Athletic
 Ton Pentre 
 Tonyrefail BGC

Division One

 Aberdare Town 
 Aberfan Social 
 AFC Butetown 
 AFC Penrhiwceiber 
 AFC Whitchurch
 Caerphilly Athletic
 Canton Rangers 
 Clwb Cymric
 Cwm Welfare
 Grange Albion 
 Maesteg Park 
 Sully Sports
 Trebanog 
 Treforest
 Treherbert BGC 
 Vale United

Division Two

 AFC Wattstown
 Bettws
 Cardiff Cosmopolitan
 Cogan Coronation
 Cwmbach Royal Stars
 Fairwater 
 Llangeinor
 Llantwit Fardre
 Nelson Cavaliers
 Penrhiwfer 
 Penygraig United 
 St Albans
 St Josephs
 Tata Steel United 
 Ton & Gelli 
 Tongwynlais

Recent champions

References

External links
 Official League website
 League Twitter

 
4
5
Sports leagues established in 2015
2015 establishments in Wales
Fourth level football leagues in Europe